The following article presents a summary of the 2022–23 football season in Croatia, which is the 32nd season of competitive football in the country.

National teams

Croatia

Croatia U21

Croatia U19

Croatia U17

Croatia Women's

Croatia Women's U19

Croatia Women's U17

League tables

Croatian Football League

First Football League

Second Football League

Croatian clubs in Europe

Summary

Dinamo Zagreb

Hajduk Split

Osijek

Rijeka

ŽNK Split

Dinamo Zagreb U19

Hajduk Split U19

References